Order of Independence or Independence Order is a Vietnamese decoration.

Criteria 
The Vietnamese government states that the decoration "shall be conferred or posthumously conferred on individuals who have recorded exceptionally outstanding achievements in one of the political, economic, social, literature, art, scientific, technological, defense, security, diplomatic or other domains. It shall be conferred on collectives which satisfy the following criteria:"
 Having recorded outstanding achievements for five or more consecutive years before the time of nomination; having maintained internal unity, with clean and strong Party and mass organizations;
 Having a process of building and development of 30 years or more; if having been conferred the second-class "Independence Order," they must have a process of building and development of 25 years or more.

See also 
 Vietnam awards and decorations

References

Orders, decorations, and medals of Vietnam
Military awards and decorations of Vietnam
Awards established in 1947
1947 establishments in Vietnam